The iconoclast Council of Hieria was a Christian council of 754 which viewed itself as ecumenical, but was later rejected by the Second Council of Nicaea (787) and by Catholic and Orthodox churches, since none of the five major patriarchs were represented in Hieria. However it is preferred over Second Nicea by some Protestants.

The Council of Hieria was summoned by the Byzantine Emperor Constantine V in 754 in the palace of Hieria at Chalcedon. The council supported the emperor's iconoclast position in the Byzantine iconoclasm controversy, condemning the spiritual and liturgical use of iconography as heretical.

Opponents of the council described it as the Mock Synod of Constantinople or the Headless Council because no patriarchs or representatives of the five great patriarchates were present: the see of Constantinople was vacant; Antioch, Jerusalem and Alexandria were under Islamic dominion; while Rome was not asked to participate. Its rulings were anathematized at the Lateran Council of 769 before being overturned almost entirely by the Second Council of Nicaea in 787, which upheld the orthodoxy of and endorsed the veneration of holy images.

Images
Three hundred and thirty-eight members attended the 754 council. It endorsed Constantine V's iconoclast position, with the bishops declaring that "the unlawful art of painting living creatures blasphemed the fundamental doctrine of our salvation--namely, the Incarnation of Christ, and contradicted the six holy synods. [...] If anyone shall endeavour to represent the forms of the Saints in lifeless pictures with material colours which are of no value (for this notion is vain and introduced by the devil), and does not rather represent their virtues as living images in himself, etc. [...] let him be anathema". This council declared itself the 'Seventh Ecumenical Council'.

Similar pronouncements on the issue of religious images may had been made in the Synod of Elvira (c. 305) whose canon 36 states: "Pictures are not to be placed in churches, so that they do not become objects of worship and adoration". If understood this way, it is the earliest such prohibition known. Though a more formal translation would suggest that the canon is actually about not having images painted directly into the walls in order to protect them from vandalism.

Legitimacy of the Council
After the later triumph of the Iconodules, this council became known as a robber council, i.e. as uncanonical.

Edward J. Martin writes, "On the ecumenical character of the Council there are graver doubts. Its president was Theodosius, archbishop of Ephesus, son of the Emperor Apsimar. He was supported by Sisinnius, bishop of Perga, also known as Pastillas, and by Basil of Antioch in Pisidia, styled Tricaccabus. Not a single Patriarch was present. The see of Constantinople was vacant. Whether the Pope and the Patriarchs of Alexandria, Antioch, and Jerusalem were invited or not is unknown. They were not present either in person or by deputy. The Council of Nicaea [II] considered this was a serious flaw in the legitimacy of the Council. 'It had not the co-operation of the Roman Pope of the period nor of his clergy, either by representative or by encyclical letter, as the law of Councils requires.' The Life of Stephen borrows this objection from the Acts and embroiders it to suit the spirit of the age of Theodore. It had not the approval of the Pope of Rome, although the modern day Catholic theologians assert that there is a canon that no ecclesiastical measures may be passed without the Pope.' The absence of the other Patriarchs is then noticed." The council was later refuted at the Council of Constantinople (843) which reasserted the significance of icons in the Church.

Some Protestants embrace the legitimacy of the council.

References

Sources

External links
CCEL

Hieria
Byzantine Iconoclasm
Hieria
750s in the Byzantine Empire
754